The following is a list of notable op artists:

Yaacov Agam (born 1928)
Josef Albers (18881976)
Richard Allen (19331999)
Getulio Alviani (19392018)
Anonima group
Richard Anuszkiewicz (19302020)
Marina Apollonio (born 1940)
Gianni Colombo (19371993)
Carlos Cruz-Díez (19232019)
Tony DeLap (19272019)
Hugo Demarco (19321995)
Günter Fruhtrunk (19231982)
Michael Kidner (19172009)
Julio Le Parc (born 1928)
Heinz Mack (born 1931)
John McHale (19221978)
Youri Messen-Jaschin (born 1941)
Vera Molnar (born 1924)
François Morellet (19262016)
Les Murdoch (born 1957)
Reginald H. Neal (19091992)
Andreas Nottebohm (born 1944)
Ivan Picelj (19242011)
Omar Rayo (19282010)
Bridget Riley (born 1931)
Kenneth Snelson (19272016)
Jesús Rafael Soto (19232005)
Arnold Alfred Schmidt (19301993)
Julian Stanczak (1928-2017)
Günther Uecker (born 1930)
Grazia Varisco (born 1937)
Victor Vasarely (19081997)
Ludwig Wilding (19272010)
Marian Zazeela (born 1940)

Op